Ali Ben Ali (born 23 July 1933) is a Tunisian former cyclist. He competed in the individual road race and team time trial events at the 1960 Summer Olympics.

References

External links
 

1933 births
Living people
Tunisian male cyclists
Olympic cyclists of Tunisia
Cyclists at the 1960 Summer Olympics
Sportspeople from Tunis
20th-century Tunisian people